Sulawesi Utara United Football Club is an Indonesian football club based in Manado, North Sulawesi. The club currently plays in Liga 2.

History
The club's roots go back to 1990, formed as Persikad Depok played in Depok, West Java. In 2009, Persikad experienced a severe financial crisis that left the management team owing 11 months' wages to the players. A businessman named Edy Djoekardi rescued the team by buying a majority stake in PT. Persikad Depok. Djoekardi planned to invest millions of dollars to build a team capable of performing up to the international scene, and to build infrastructure, such as stadiums. The club briefly moved to Purwakarta and played as Persikad Purwakarta in 2015 but returned again to Depok a year later. Persikad Depok finally was sold and move to Bogor and rebranded as Bogor F.C. in 2017 similar story to Milton Keynes Dons F.C., but later the supporters formed a phoenix club called Persikad 1999 in 2018 with purchasing other club's linsence in Liga 3 from Purwakarta Mars Gelatik FC.

In 2018, they played in Liga 3 from National Zone Route as continuation of Persikad Depok under Bogor FC name.

The club had a promising start in 2019 with signing some great players and hiring Vladimir Vujovic as head coach but later it turned into shambles after the chairman suddenly left club before the Liga 2 2019 season starts.

In May 2019, the club moved to Manado and once again changed their identity from Bogor FC to Sulut United.

Players

Current squad

Out on loan

Coaching staff

References

External links
Sulut United FC Instagram

Manado
Sport in North Sulawesi
Football clubs in Indonesia
Association football clubs established in 2019
2019 establishments in Indonesia
Football clubs in North Sulawesi